John William Campbell (born October 7, 1938) is a United States Navy veteran and a former American football linebacker  in the National Football League from 1963 to 1969.  Campbell was 6'3" 225lbs when he played in the NFL.  John married Sue (Wilson) Campbell in 1965 and has four adult children and three grandchildren.  After his football career, he worked at WCCO TV in Minneapolis and was a stockbroker for several years.  He also started his own media packaging company, J.C.A. (John Campbell and Associates).  John continues to serve as a Christian motivational speaker and has presented the 'Man In The Mirror' seminar series to Christian men's groups worldwide. Currently John is an Associate pastor at Life Church in Bloomington Minnesota.  He is also a volunteer chaplain with the Burnsville Minnesota Police Department. John and Sue have lived in Burnsville Minnesota since 1968.

References

1938 births
Living people
American football linebackers
Baltimore Colts players
Minnesota Golden Gophers football players
Minnesota Vikings players
Pittsburgh Steelers players
People from Wadena, Minnesota
Players of American football from Minnesota